The Alberta Golden Bears football team represents the University of Alberta in the sport of Canadian football in U Sports. The Golden Bears have been in competition since 1910 and the team has won three Vanier Cup national championships, in 1967, 1972, and most recently in 1980. The Golden Bears have also won 18 Hardy Cup conference titles, second only to the Saskatchewan Huskies who have won 19 of them. The Golden Bears have also had three players win the Hec Crighton Trophy, with Mel Smith winning in 1971, Brian Fryer winning in 1975, and most recently Ed Ilnicki winning the award in 2017.

Recent history

In the 2000s, the Golden Bears had seen mixed results as the team made the playoffs in five of ten seasons between 2001-2010. In four of those seasons, Alberta reached the Hardy Cup, but came away with losses each time. Despite playing in the Hardy Cup in 2010, the Golden Bears finished winless in 2011 following the resignation of longtime head coach Jerry Friesen. UBC defaulted two wins to Alberta that year, but the following season was once again winless as the Golden Bears finished at the bottom of the standings. The Golden Bears saw improvement in 2014 by posting a 3-5 record, but finished fifth and missed the playoffs for the fourth straight year. The program saw further regression in 2015 and 2016, posting just two and one win seasons, respectively.

In 2017, the Golden Bears returned to the playoffs following a six-year absence by qualifying in the last week of the season by defeating the powerhouse Calgary Dinos and finishing 3-5. Because UBC and Manitoba finished with 2-6 records, the Golden Bears finished in fourth place and in playoff position, led by the strong play of Hec Crighton Trophy winner, Ed Ilnicki. The team lost the Canada West Semi-Final to the same Dinos by a score of 39-22. In the following year, the team was once again out of the playoffs, finishing 2-6, which included a default win after the Regina Rams had to forfeit a victory due to the use of an ineligible player.

Recent season results

National award winners
Hec Crighton Trophy: Mel Smith (1971), Brian Fryer (1975), Ed Ilnicki (2017)
J. P. Metras Trophy: Gerry Inglis (1976), Dave Willox (1978), Garret Everson (1998)
Presidents' Trophy: Mark Singer (1989), Josiah Schakel (2021)
Peter Gorman Trophy: Jeff Funtasz (1984)
Russ Jackson Award: Sam Stetsko (1997), Carlo Panaro (1999, 2000)
Frank Tindall Trophy: Jim Donlevy (1971), Jerry Friesen (2004)

Golden Bears in the CFL
As of the end of the 2022 CFL season, seven former Golden Bears players were on CFL teams' rosters:
David Beard, Hamilton Tiger-Cats
Jayden Dalke, Saskatchewan Roughriders
Mark Korte, Edmonton Elks
Justin Lawrence, Montreal Alouettes
Cole Nelson, Edmonton Elks
Shaydon Philip, Ottawa Redblacks
Josiah Schakel, Calgary Stampeders

References

External links
 

 
U Sports football teams
1910 establishments in Alberta
Canadian football teams in Edmonton
Sports clubs established in 1910